The Flower of Aleppo is a 2016 Tunisian drama film directed by Ridha Behi. It was originally selected as the Tunisian entry for the Best Foreign Language Film at the 89th Academy Awards, but this was changed to As I Open My Eyes by Leyla Bouzid.

Cast
 Hend Sabry as Salma
 Hichem Rostom
 Badis Behi as Mourad
 Ahmed Hafiene
 Amer Abu Matar as Abu Khalil

Release
The film was initially screened for the first time at the opening ceremony of the 27th Carthage Film Festival on 28 October 2016, then it had its regular release in theaters in Tunisia on 6 November 2016.

See also
 List of submissions to the 89th Academy Awards for Best Foreign Language Film
 List of Tunisian submissions for the Academy Award for Best Foreign Language Film

References

External links
 

2016 films
2016 drama films
2010s French-language films
2016 multilingual films
2010s Arabic-language films
Tunisian drama films
Tunisian multilingual films